The Doctrine and Covenants (sometimes abbreviated and cited as D&C or D. and C.) is a part of the open scriptural canon of several denominations of the Latter Day Saint movement. Originally published in 1835 as Doctrine and Covenants of the Church of the Latter Day Saints: Carefully Selected from the Revelations of God, editions of the book continue to be printed mainly by the Church of Jesus Christ of Latter-day Saints (LDS Church) and the Community of Christ (formerly the Reorganized Church of Jesus Christ of Latter Day Saints [RLDS Church]).

The book originally contained two parts: a sequence of lectures setting forth basic church doctrine, followed by a compilation of revelations, or "covenants" of the church: thus the name "Doctrine and Covenants". The "doctrine" portion of the book, however, has been removed by both the LDS Church and Community of Christ. The remaining portion of the book contains revelations on numerous topics, most of which were dictated by the movement's founder Joseph Smith, supplemented by materials periodically added by each denomination.

Controversy has existed between the two largest denominations of the Latter Day Saint movement over some sections added to the 1876 LDS edition, attributed to founder Smith. Whereas the LDS Church believes these sections to have been revelations to Smith, the RLDS Church traditionally disputed their authenticity.

History
The Doctrine and Covenants was first published in 1835 as a later version of the Book of Commandments, which had been partially printed in 1833. This earlier book contained 65 early revelations to church leaders, notably Joseph Smith and Oliver Cowdery. Before many copies of the book could be printed, the printing press and most of the printed copies were destroyed by a mob in Missouri.

On September 24, 1834, a committee was appointed by the general assembly of the church to organize a new volume containing the most significant revelations. This committee of Presiding Elders, consisting of Smith, Cowdery, Sidney Rigdon, and Frederick G. Williams, began to review and revise numerous revelations for inclusion in the new work. The committee eventually organized the book into two parts: a "Doctrine" part and a "Covenants" part.

The "Doctrine" part of the book consisted of a theological course now called the "Lectures on Faith". The lectures were a series of doctrinal courses used in the School of the Prophets which had recently been completed in Kirtland, Ohio. According to the committee, these lectures were included in the compilation "in consequence of their embracing the important doctrine of salvation."
The "Covenants" part of the book, labeled "Covenants and Commandments of the Lord, to his servants of the church of the Latter Day Saints", contained a total of 103 revelations. These 103 revelations were said to "contain items or principles for the regulation of the church, as taken from the revelations which have been given since its organization, as well as from former ones." Each of the 103 revelations was assigned a "section number"; however, section 66 was mistakenly used twice. Thus, the sections of the original work were numbered only to 102.

On February 17, 1835, after the committee had selected the book's contents, the committee wrote that the resulting work represents "our belief, and when we say this, humbly trust, the faith and principles of this society as a body."

The book was first introduced to the church body in a general conference on August 17, 1835. Smith and Williams, two of the Presiding Elders on the committee, were absent, but Cowdery and Rigdon were present. The church membership at the time had not yet seen the Doctrine and Covenants manuscript as it had been compiled and revised solely by the committee; however, various church members who were familiar with the work "bore record" of the book's truth. At the end of the conference, the church "by a unanimous vote" agreed to accept the compilation as "the doctrine and covenants of their faith" and to make arrangements for its printing.

In 1835, the book was printed and published under the title Doctrine and Covenants of the Church of the Latter Day Saints: Carefully Selected from the Revelations of God.

A copy of the Doctrine and Covenants from NASA photographer M. Edward Thomas traveled to the moon and back in 1972 with astronaut John Young aboard Apollo 16.

LDS Church editions
In  the LDS Church, The Doctrine and Covenants of The Church of Jesus Christ of Latter-day Saints stands alongside the Bible, the Book of Mormon, and the Pearl of Great Price as scripture. Together the LDS Church's scriptures are referred to as the "standard works". The LDS Church's version of the Doctrine and Covenants is described by the church as "containing revelations given to Joseph Smith, the Prophet, with some additions by his successors in the Presidency of the Church."

Sections added to LDS edition
The 138 sections and two official declarations in LDS Church's Doctrine and Covenants break down as follows:
Sections 1–134, 137: From the presidency of Joseph Smith (1828–44)
Sections 135–136: During the administration of the Quorum of the Twelve (1844–47)
Official Declaration 1: From the presidency of Wilford Woodruff (1889–98)
Section 138: From the presidency of Joseph F. Smith (1901–18)
Official Declaration 2: From the presidency of Spencer W. Kimball (1973–85)

The following sections consist of letters, reports, statements, and other similar documents: 102, 123, 127–131, 134, 135, and Official Declarations 1 and 2.

In 1844, the church added eight sections not included in the 1835 edition. In the current edition, these added sections are numbered 103, 105, 112, 119, 124, 127, 128, and 135.

In 1876, a new LDS Church edition renumbered most of the sections in a roughly chronological order instead of the earlier topical order, and included 26 sections not included in previous editions, now numbered as sections 2, 13, 77, 85, 87, 108–111, 113–118, 120–123, 125, 126, 129–132, and 136. Previous editions had been divided into verses with the early versifications generally following the paragraph structure of the original text. It was with the 1876 edition that the currently used versification was first employed.

During the 1880s, five foreign editions contained two revelations to John Taylor that were received in 1882 and 1883; these revelations "set in order" the priesthood, gave more clarification about the roles of priesthood offices—especially the seventy—and required "men who ... preside over my priesthood" to live plural marriage in order to qualify to hold their church positions. Due to the LDS Church's change in attitude to polygamy in 1890, these sections were not included in future English editions of the Doctrine and Covenants.

In 1930, a small volume edited by apostle James E. Talmage titled Latter-day Revelations was published, which was a highly edited selective version of the Doctrine and Covenants. Talmage wrote that the book's purpose was "to make the strictly doctrinal parts of the Doctrine and Covenants of easy access and reduce its bulk" by including only "the sections comprising scriptures of general and enduring value". Ninety-five of the sections of the Doctrine and Covenants were completely omitted—most notably section 132 on plural and celestial marriage—along with parts of 21 others. Twenty complete sections were retained along with parts of 21 others. Fundamentalist Mormons were offended, particularly at the exclusion of section 132, and accused the church of "changing the scriptures." As a result, church president Heber J. Grant ordered the withdrawal of the book from sale with the remaining copies shredded in order to "avoid further conflict with the fundamentalists".

Sections 137 and 138 were added to the LDS Church's 1981 edition of the Doctrine and Covenants, which is the edition currently in use by the church. These were accounts of two visions, one from Joseph Smith in 1837 and the other from his nephew, Joseph F. Smith, in 1918. The revelations were earlier accepted as scripture when added to the Pearl of Great Price in April 1976. No new revelatory sections have been added since 1981.

The LDS Church's 1981 edition contains two "Official Declarations" at the book's conclusion. The 1890 Official Declaration 1 ended the church-authorized practice of plural marriage, and the 1978 Official Declaration 2 announces the opening of priesthood ordination to all worthy male members without regard to race or color. The two Official Declarations are not revelations, but they serve as the formal announcements that a revelation was received. In neither case is the revelation included in the Doctrine and Covenants. The text of Official Declaration 1 has been included in every LDS Church printing of the Doctrine and Covenants since 1908.

Portions removed from the LDS edition

In 1876, section 101 from the 1835 edition (and subsequent printings) was removed. Section 101 was a "Statement on Marriage" as adopted by an 1835 conference of the church, and contained the following text: 
 
This section was removed because it had been superseded by section 132 of the modern LDS edition, recorded in 1843, which contains a revelation received by Joseph Smith on eternal marriage and plural marriage, the origin of the principles of which the LDS Church traces to as early as 1831.

In 1921, the LDS Church removed the "Lectures on Faith" portion of the book, with an explanation that the lectures "were never presented to nor accepted by the Church as being otherwise than theological lectures or lessons". The lectures contain theology concerning the Godhead and emphasize the importance of faith and works.

Until 1981, editions of the book used code names for certain people and places in those sections that dealt with the United Order. The 1981 LDS edition replaced these with the real names, relegating the code names to footnotes. The Community of Christ edition still uses the code names.

Community of Christ editions
Officials of the Community of Christ (formerly known as the Reorganized Church of Jesus Christ of Latter Day Saints [RLDS Church]) first published an edition of the Doctrine and Covenants in 1864, based on the previous 1844 edition. A general conference of the church in 1878 approved a resolution that declared that the revelations of the Prophet-President Joseph Smith III had equal standing to those previously included in the work. Since that time, the church has continued to add sections to its edition of the Doctrine and Covenants, containing the revelations of succeeding Prophet-Presidents. The most recent addition was formally authorized on April 14, 2010, after being presented to the church for informal consideration on January 17, 2010. The numbers of the sections and versification differ from the edition published by the LDS Church and both modern editions differ from the original 1835 edition numeration.

Sections added to the Community of Christ edition
The 167 sections of the Community of Christ's Doctrine and Covenants break down as follows:
Sections 1–113 (includes 108A): From the presidency of Joseph Smith (1828–44)
Sections 114–131: From the presidency of Joseph Smith III (1860–1914)
Sections 132–138: From the presidency of Frederick M. Smith (1914–46)
Sections 139–144: From the presidency of Israel A. Smith (1946–58)
Sections 145–152 (includes 149A): From the presidency of W. Wallace Smith (1958–78)
Sections 153–160: From the presidency of Wallace B. Smith (1978–96)
Sections 161–162: From the presidency of W. Grant McMurray (1996–2004)
Sections 163–165: From the presidency of Stephen M. Veazey (2005–)

The following sections are not revelations, but letters, reports, statements, and other similar documents: 99, 108A, 109–113, and 123.

Based on the above, the number of revelations (accounting for sections that are not revelations) presented by each Community of Christ president, are as follows:

Joseph Smith: 107
Joseph Smith III: 17
Frederick M. Smith: 7
Israel A. Smith: 6
W. Wallace Smith: 9
Wallace B. Smith: 8
W. Grant McMurray: 2
Stephen M. Veazey: 3

Portions removed from the Community of Christ edition
The Community of Christ removed the "Lectures on Faith" in 1897. The 1970 World Conference concluded that several sections that had been added between the 1835 and 1844 editions—mainly dealing with the subjects of temple worship and baptism for the dead—had been published without proper approval of a church conference. As a result, the World Conference removed sections 107, 109, 110, 113, and 123 to a historical appendix, which also includes documents that were never published as sections. Of these, only section 107 was a revelation. The World Conference of 1990 subsequently removed the entire appendix from the Doctrine and Covenants. Section 108A contained the minutes of a business meeting, which, because of its historical nature, was moved to the Introduction in the 1970s. After 1990, the Introduction was updated, and what was section 108A was removed entirely.

Doctrinal developments in the Community of Christ edition
The ongoing additions to the Community of Christ edition provide a record of the leadership changes and doctrinal developments within the denomination. When W. Grant McMurray became Prophet-President, he declared that instruction specific to leadership changes would no longer be included, so that the focus of the work could be more doctrinal in nature, and less administrative. The record of these leadership changes are still maintained in the form of published "letters of counsel." Prophet-President Stephen M. Veazey has conformed to this pattern. Although these letters are not formally published in the Doctrine and Covenants, they are still deemed to be inspired, and are dealt with in the same manner that revelations are (that is, they must be deliberated and approved by the voting members of a World Conference).

A modern revelation that resulted in some "disaffection" and "led to intense conflict in scattered areas of the RLDS Church" is contained in the Community of Christ version's section 156, presented by Prophet–President Wallace B. Smith and added in 1984, which called for the ordination of women to the priesthood and set out the primary purpose of temples to be "the pursuit of peace". A resulting schism over the legitimacy of these change led to the formation of the Restoration Branches movement, the Restoration Church of Jesus Christ of Latter Day Saints and the Remnant Church of Jesus Christ of Latter Day Saints.

While some of the prose in the new revelations seems designed to guide the denomination on matters of church governance and doctrine, others are seen as inspirational. One such example can be cited from section 161, presented as counsel to the church by W. Grant McMurray in 1996: "Become a people of the Temple—those who see violence but proclaim peace, who feel conflict yet extend the hand of reconciliation, who encounter broken spirits and find pathways for healing."

Editions used by other denominations
The Church of Jesus Christ of Latter Day Saints (Strangite) uses the 1846 edition that was published in Nauvoo, Illinois; this version is virtually identical to the 1844 edition. Most recently a facsimile reprint was produced for the church at Voree, Wisconsin by Richard Drew in 1993.

The Church of Christ (Temple Lot) contends that the thousands of changes made to the original revelations as published in the Book of Commandments (including the change of the church's name) are not doctrinal and result from Joseph Smith's fall from his original calling. As a result, the Church of Christ (Temple Lot) prefers to use reprints of the Book of Commandments text.

The Church of Jesus Christ (Cutlerite) accepts the 1844 edition of the Doctrine and Covenants, including the Lectures on Faith, which it insists are as much inspired as the revelations themselves.

The Restoration Branches generally use the older RLDS Church Doctrine and Covenants, typically sections 1–144.

The Remnant Church of Jesus Christ of Latter Day Saints uses the older RLDS Church version of the Doctrine and Covenants up to section 144, and also 19 new revelations from their previous president, Frederick Niels Larsen.

"Remnant" movement, a spiritual movement in schism with the LDS Church, published an online "Restoration" edition of the Doctrine and Covenants in 2017. It includes any sections authored by Joseph Smith. It also: includes a new version of D&C 54, as revised by Denver Snuffer; excludes the Kirtland Temple visitation by Elijah and other angelic beings in D&C 110; excludes portions based on fragmentary teachings by Smith in D&C 129; includes Smith's Lectures on Faith; and includes a new appendix titled, "A Prophet’s Prerogative," by Jeff Savage.

Chart comparison of editions
The following chart compares the current editions of the Doctrine and Covenants used by the LDS Church (LDS ed.) and Community of Christ (CofC ed.) with the 1833 Book of Commandments (BofC), the 1835 edition published in Kirtland, and the 1844 edition published in Nauvoo. Unless otherwise specified, the document is styled a "revelation" of the person delivering it.

See also

List of non-canonical revelations in The Church of Jesus Christ of Latter-day Saints
Proclamations of the First Presidency and the Quorum of the Twelve Apostles
Urim and Thummim (Latter Day Saints)

Notes

References
The Doctrine and Covenants of The Church of Jesus Christ of Latter-day Saints Containing Revelations Given to Joseph Smith, the Prophet, with Some Additions by his Successors in the Presidency of the Church, Intellectual Reserve: Salt Lake City, UT, 1981.
Book of Doctrine and Covenants: Carefully Selected from the Revelations of God and Given in the Order of their Dates, Herald Publishing House: Independence, MO, 2000.
Joseph Smith, The Doctrine and Covenants of the Church of Jesus Christ of Latter Day Saints: Carefully Selected from the Revelations of God, photo enlarged and reprinted from the 1846 Nauvoo edition by Richard Drew, Burlington (Voree), Wisconsin, 1993, for the Church of Jesus Christ of Latter Day Saints (Strangite).
Peter Judd, Journey in Trust: A Study Resource for D&C 161, Herald House, 2004. 
Book of Commandments: Herald Heritage Reprint, Herald House, 1833 (reprint). 
F. Henry Edwards, The Edwards Commentary on the Doctrine & Covenants, Herald House, 1986.

Further reading

External links
 at Wikisource (LDS Church version).
Doctrine and Covenants – Complete official 2013 LDS Church edition
Doctrine and Covenants Official LDS Church edition (pdf)
RLDS Sections 1–144 – unofficial HTML version produced for the Restoration Branches
RLDS Sections 145–159 – unofficial HTML version produced for the Restoration Branches
Community of Christ Edition  (Section 160; official HTML version)
Community of Christ Edition  (Section 161; official HTML version)
Community of Christ Edition  (Section 162; official HTML version)
Community of Christ Edition  (Section 163; official HTML version)
Community of Christ Edition  (Section 164; official HTML version)
Community of Christ Edition  (Section 165; official HTML version)
Scanned images of the complete 1833 Book of Commandments, 1835 Doctrine and Covenants (with Lectures on Faith)], and 1844 Doctrine and Covenants
SaintsWithoutHalos.org: Doctrine and Covenants – Mormon historical revisionist site with thoroughly annotated D&C showing changes from various editions.

 
Community of Christ
Works by Joseph Smith
1835 books
1835 in Christianity
Works in the style of the King James Version
Standard works
Revelation in Mormonism